Framlingham is a market town and civil parish in Suffolk, England. Of Anglo-Saxon origin, it appears in the 1086 Domesday Book. The parish had a population of 3,342 at the 2011 Census and an estimated 4,016 in 2019. Nearby villages include Earl Soham, Kettleburgh, Parham, Saxtead and Sweffling.

Governance
An electoral ward of the same name exists. The parish stretches north-east to Brundish with a total ward population taken at the 2011 Census of 4,744.

Features
Framlingham's history can be traced to an entry in the Domesday Book (1086) when it then consisted of several manors.

The medieval Framlingham Castle is a major feature and tourist attraction for the area, managed by English Heritage. 
Mary Tudor (daughter of Henry VIII and his first wife Catherine of Aragon) was proclaimed the first Queen of England there in 1553. It is referred to in Ed Sheeran's 2017 single "Castle on the Hill", Sheeran having grown up in Framlingham. There is a large lake or mere next to it which used to supply the castle with fish. It is managed by the Suffolk Wildlife Trust. A nature walk in woodland can be made around the mere.There is also a large meadow adjacent to the Castle which holds various outdoor events and productions in the summer and where people can picnic.

The town is home to the comprehensive secondary Thomas Mills High School, the independent school Framlingham College, the Church of St Michael the Archangel, which dates from the 12th century (the main rebuilding dates from the late 15th and 16th centuries), and Framlingham Town F.C.

The town has the two oldest functioning Post Office pillar boxes in the UK, dating from 1856, located in Double Street and in College Road. The pillar boxes are marked V. R. Victoria Regina, after Queen Victoria.

Framlingham also has one of the smallest houses in Britain, known as the "Check House". Converted into a two-storey residence of under 29 square metres, the former bookmakers office is in the Mauldens Mill Estate in the town centre.

There is a traditional English market in the town square, Market Hill, every Tuesday and Saturday mornings offering fruit and vegetables, artisan bread and cakes, fresh fish, coffee, cheese and pies, and other occasional stalls.

Framlingham has a small museum currently located within the castle

Framlingham is surrounded by agricultural land. It lies some 14 miles from the coastal town of Aldeburgh and 20 miles from Southwold. It is also 10 miles from the renowned music centre of Snape Maltings. It is approximately 5 miles from the A12, one of the main arteries into and out of Suffolk and approximately 15 miles north east of Ipswich.

In 2006 Country Life magazine voted Framlingham the best place to live in the country.

Framlingham has a conservation area. An oak tree planted in 1911 in honour of the Coronation of King George V survives outside the old railway station, now a pub named The Station in Station Road.

Framlingham was the main location for the BBC television comedy series Detectorists, starring Mackenzie Crook, Toby Jones and Rachael Stirling. It has also appeared in numerous other TV programmes.

A famous family orientated sausage festival is held in October. This event has butchers from Framlingham and the surrounding villages competing for the trophy of best sausage in the area. The town is closed to traffic on the day and people follow a map around the town sampling the different flavoured sausages and voting for their favourite. There is also market stalls and entertainment held on market hill on the day.

Other festivals and events are held in the town and around the castle throughout the year.

Education
Framlingham College is an independent, co-educational secondary school for boarders and day students, opened as Albert Memorial College in 1865 in memory of Albert, Prince Consort. Its associated preparatory school is at Brandeston Hall.

Thomas Mills High School, dating from 1751, is considerably older than Framlingham College. It is a mixed secondary state school for pupils aged 11–18, which gained academy status in 2011. The singer Ed Sheeran attended this school.

Framlingham's primary school is  Sir Robert Hitcham's Church of England Voluntary Primary School, dating back to at least 1654. It now has circa 350 pupils and another 26 in its nursery.

Transport
The Framlingham Branch connected Framlingham by rail with the main Ipswich to Lowestoft East Suffolk line at Wickham Market. The railway station building stands adjacent to the Station Hotel. The branch closed to passenger traffic in November 1952 and to goods in April 1965. The nearest stations today are Wickham Market at Campsea Ashe and Saxmundham, both on the East Suffolk Line.

The town is at the junction of the B1116, B1119 and B1120 roads, four miles (6.4 km) west of the A12. The local bus services are detailed on the Suffolk On Board site.

Sport and leisure
Framlingham has a Non-League football club, Framlingham Town F.C., which plays at Badingham Road, where there is a sports club offering tennis, archery, badminton, hockey and croquet. It is also where the cycling club meets. The town has a rambling club and an active Scout and Cubs group. The modern St John Ambulance Centre is in Fairfield Road.

Framlingham College, an Independent School has a swimming pool and gymnasium open to the public in pre-booked slots. Membership fees are required.

There are four pubs in the town, namely:  The Castle Inn, The Railway, The Station and The Crown (which is also a restaurant and hotel). There is a library, a post office, a pharmacy, a small supermarket and a selection of specialised shops and coffee shops.

The town attracts a number of tourists, particularly in the summer months, drawn to the town itself, the castle, St Michael's Church and walks that are available around the town of the stunning countryside .

Notable people
In order of birth:
Thomas Howard, 2nd Duke of Norfolk (1443–1524), who held office under four kings, died at Framlingham Castle.
Sir Robert Hitcham (c. 1572–1636), was a member of Parliament, attorney general and philanthropist, who bought Framlingham Castle in 1635.
Theophilus Howard, 2nd Earl of Suffolk, KG (1584–1640), politician, owned Framlingham Castle until 1635.
Thomas Danforth, a Massachusetts Bay Colony magistrate and landowner born in 1623 in Framlingham, son of Nicholas
Samuel Danforth, poet, Puritan and evangelist to American Indians, born in 1626 in Framlingham, son of Nicholas
Nicholas Revett, architect and theorist, born in Framlingham in 1720
Alethea Lewis (1749–1787), the novelist, brought up by her maternal grandfather in Framlingham
Edmund Goodwyn (1756–1832), physician born in Framlingham, who discovered the diving reflex
Robert Hindes Groome (1810–1889), composer, author and cleric, born in Framlingham
Henry Thompson (1820–1894), polymath and surgeon who operated on the Belgian royal family, born in Framlingham
John Cordy Jeaffreson (1831–1901), writer and lawyer, born in Framlingham
Samuel Cornell Plant (1866–1921), master mariner and Senior Inspector, Upper Yangtze River
Francis Stocks (1873–1929), county cricketer, died in Framlingham
Frederick Bird (1875–1965), county cricketer and cleric, born in Framlingham
Michael Lord (born 1938), deputy speaker and MP for the town, took the title Baron Framlingham rather than "Lord Lord" on becoming a life peer.
Charles Freeman (born 1947), former Head of History at St Clare's, Oxford, and teacher of Ancient History for Cambridge University's Extramural programme, was a prolific author on ancient, Christian and early medieval history.
Alice Russell (born 1976), soul singer, grew up in Framlingham.
Christina Johnston (born 1989), classical coloratura soprano, grew up in Framlingham and attended Framlingham College.
Laura Wright (born 1990), classical/popular crossover soprano, grew up in Framlingham.
Ed Sheeran (born 1991), singer–songwriter, grew up in Framlingham and attended Thomas Mills High School. The town is the subject of his hit single "Castle on the Hill".

See also
RAF Framlingham, a Second World War bomber airfield near Framlingham
Quay House

References

External links

The Framlingham website
Framlingham.com
Framlingham: Local History
The History of Framlingham, in the County of Suffolk: Including Brief Notices of the Masters and Fellows of Pembroke-Hall in Cambridge, from the Foundation of the College, to the Present Time, Robert Hawes & Robert Loder, published 1798
The History, Topography, and Antiquities of Framlingham and Saxsted, in the County of Suffolk, R. Green, published 1834

 
Civil parishes in Suffolk
Market towns in Suffolk
Towns in Suffolk